Coenopoeus palmeri is a species of longhorn beetle of the subfamily Lamiinae. It was described by John Lawrence LeConte in 1873.

References

Acanthocinini
Beetles described in 1873